Robert Culling Hanbury (19 March 1823 – 29 March 1867) was a British Liberal and Whig politician.

Born at St Mary Spital Square Church in Tower Hamlets, London, Hanbury was the son of Robert Hanbury and Emily Willett Hall. In 1849, he married Caroline, daughter of Abel Smith and Frances Anne née Calvert, and they had at least five children: Edmund Smith (1850–1913); Evan (born 1854); Emily (born 1855); Mabel (1859–1941); and Caroline Rachel (1862–1949). After Caroline's death in 1863, he remarried to Frances Selina Eardley, daughter of Culling Eardley and Isabella née Carr in 1865. He also had one other child, Anthony Ashley Hanbury, who died in 1914.

Hanbury was first elected Whig MP for Middlesex at the 1857 general election and, becoming a Liberal in 1859, held the seat until his death in 1867.

Outside of politics, Hanbury was a partner in East London brewery Truman, Hanbury, Buxton & Company.

References

External links
 

Liberal Party (UK) MPs for English constituencies
Whig (British political party) MPs for English constituencies
UK MPs 1857–1859
UK MPs 1859–1865
UK MPs 1865–1868
1823 births
1867 deaths